Baba and similar words may refer to:

Places

Poland 
 Baba, Masovian Voivodeship (east-central Poland)
 Baba, Mogilno County in Kuyavian-Pomeranian Voivodeship (north-central Poland)
 Baba, Rypin County in Kuyavian-Pomeranian Voivodeship (north-central Poland)
 Baba, Greater Poland Voivodeship (west-central Poland)

Romania 
 Baba, a village in Horea Commune, Alba County, Romania
 Baba, a village in Coroieni Commune, Maramureș County, Romania
 Baba, a tributary of the river Ghelința in Covasna County, Romania
 Baba, a tributary of the river Putna in Vrancea County, Romania

Other countries 
 Baba mountain range, also known as Koh-i-Baba, in the Hindu Kush of Afghanistan
 Baba Canton, a canton in Los Ríos Province, Ecuador
 Baba, Iran, a village in Kurdistan Province
 Baba, Kohgiluyeh and Boyer-Ahmad, a village in Kohgiluyeh and Boyer-Ahmad Province, Iran
 Baba River (Ouham), in Central African Republic, a tributary of the Ouham River
 Baba River, in North Macedonia, noted for Kolešino Falls
 Cape Baba, a cape in Turkey

People and characters
 Ali Baba, a character in Ali Baba and the Forty Thieves

Titles and words for people 
 baba, a familiar term for 'father' in many languages; see Mama and papa
 Baba (honorific), an honorific used in several South Asian and Middle Eastern cultures
 Baba (Alevism), an Alevi religious leader

Persons 
 Baba (name), people with the name
 Baba clan, a Japanese samurai family that was associated with Kai Province

Folklore 
 Baba (goddess) or Bau, a Sumerian goddess from Lagash
 Baba (Egyptian god) or Babi, an Egyptian god in the shape of a baboon
 Baba Yaga, a mythical older female in Slavic folklore

Fictional characters 
 Baba (The Kite Runner), in The Kite Runner media
 Baba (Dragon Ball), in Dragon Ball media
 Baba, in Redbeard comics
Baba (Baba Is You)

Arts and entertainment

Films 
 Baba (2000 film), a Chinese film
 Baba (2002 film), a Tamil film
 Bába (2008 film), a Czech short film
 Baba (2012 film), an Egyptian film

Music 
 "Baba", a song from Supposed Former Infatuation Junkie by Alanis Morissette

Food 
 Baba (cake) or Babka, a Polish yeast cake
 Baba (bread), a type of bread made by the Naxi people of Yunnan, China

Other uses 
 Paopi or Baba, the second month of the Coptic calendar
 Kurgan stelae, anthropomorphic stone stella commonly known as baba in the East Ukraine
 Baba (yacht), a line of yachts built in Taiwan
 Baba (Pillow Pal), a Pillow Pal lamb made by Ty, Inc.
 beta-Aminobutyric acid (BABA), an isomer of Aminobutyric acid
 Alibaba Group Holding Limited (New York Stock Exchange stock symbol BABA)

See also 

 BA (disambiguation)
 BA2 (disambiguation)
 Babaji (disambiguation)
 Bhabha (disambiguation)
 Babai (disambiguation)
 Babar (disambiguation)
 Babu (disambiguation)
 Baba Mountain (disambiguation)
 Baba Vanga (1911–1996), a Bulgarian mystic known as Grandmother (Baba) Vanga
 Standing Baba, a Hindu who has vowed to stand
 Baba ghanoush, a Middle Eastern eggplant dish
 Rum baba, a cake saturated in rum
 Godman (India)
 Peranakan, an ethnic group in Southeast Asia also known as Baba-Nyonya